Ernst Benda (15 January 1925 – 2 March 2009) was a German legal scholar, politician and judge. He served as the fourth president of the Federal Constitutional Court of Germany from 1971 to 1983. Benda briefly served as Minister of the Interior of Germany (1968 to 1969).

Ernst Benda was born in Berlin, the son of an engineer. Following school, he served in the Kriegsmarine from 1943 to 1945. After the war, he studied law at the Humboldt University of Berlin in East Berlin, but in 1948 moved to the University of Wisconsin and then to the Free University of Berlin in West Berlin. 1956 he started to work as a lawyer in Berlin.

From 1946 Benda was a member of the Christian Democratic Union (CDU). He was one of the founders, in 1948, of the Kampfgruppe gegen Unmenschlichkeit (KgU) ("Combat Group against Inhumanity"), an anti-communist organization operating in the GDR and which received financial support from various Western intelligence agencies and the FGR government. From 1954 to 1957 he was a member of the Abgeordnetenhaus von Berlin, the parliament of Berlin. 1957 he was elected to the Bundestag, the West German parliament. In 1965 he was involved in bringing significant changes to West Germany's statutes of limitations for murder. Without these changes, it would not have been possible to bring charges of murder against erstwhile National Socialists. Since 1967 he was Secretary of State in the German interior ministry and since 1968 Minister of the Interior. 1969 he was appointed as a judge to the Federal Constitutional Court of Germany. From 1971 to 1983 he was president of the court. From 1984 Benda was a professor of law at the University of Freiburg.

Awards and honours
1974 Grand Cross of Merit of the Italian Republic
1975 Grand Gold Medal with Ribbon for Services to the Republic of Austria
1983 Grand Cross of the Order of Merit of the Federal Republic of Germany
1974 Honorary Doctorate from the Faculty of Law, Julius-Maximilians-Universität Würzburg
1978 Honorary Professor at the University of Trier
1978 Pipe smoker of the year
1987

References

External links

 Frankfurter Allgemeine Zeitung 

1925 births
2009 deaths
Members of the Abgeordnetenhaus of Berlin
German Protestants
Jurists from Berlin
University of Wisconsin–Madison alumni
Free University of Berlin alumni
Grand Crosses 1st class of the Order of Merit of the Federal Republic of Germany
Knights Grand Cross of the Order of Merit of the Italian Republic
Recipients of the Grand Decoration with Sash for Services to the Republic of Austria
Interior ministers of Germany
Justices of the Federal Constitutional Court
Members of the Bundestag for Berlin
Members of the Bundestag 1969–1972
Members of the Bundestag 1965–1969
Members of the Bundestag 1961–1965
Members of the Bundestag 1957–1961
20th-century German judges
Members of the Bundestag for the Christian Democratic Union of Germany
Kriegsmarine personnel of World War II